The Legislative Council of Quebec was the unelected upper house of the Quebec legislature.  It was abolished effective December 31, 1968.

The Council was composed of 24 members, appointed by the Lieutenant Governor upon recommendation of the Premier.  Each councillor nominally represented a portion of the Province of Quebec called a division. Members were appointed for life; in 1963 the rule was changed to retire members at age 75, but this did not apply to already-appointed members, and in the event remained entirely theoretical since the Council was abolished before it could be applied to anyone.

During its existence, all members of the Legislative Council belonged to either the Quebec Liberal Party, the Conservative Party of Quebec, or the Union Nationale.

When it was dissolved the standings were: Union Nationale – 15, Liberal – 9.

Members

Alma
 Jean-Louis Beaudry 1867–1886	Conservative
 Sévère Rivard	1886–1888	Conservative
 Louis Tourville	1888–1896	Liberal
 Trefflé Berthiaume 	1896–1915	Conservative
 Médéric Martin	1919–1946	Liberal
 Joseph-Olier Renaud	1946–1968	Union Nationale

Bedford
 Thomas Wood	1867–1898	Conservative
 John Charles James Sarsfield McCorkill	1898–1903	Liberal
 Ernest de Varennes	1904–1919	Liberal
 Joseph-Jean-Baptiste Gosselin 	1919–1929	Liberal
 Jacob Nicol	1929–1958	Liberal
 Joseph-Oscar Gilbert	1960–1968	Union Nationale

De la Durantaye
 Joseph-Octave Beaubien	1867–1877	Conservative
 Édouard Rémillard 	1878–1887	Liberal
 Pierre Garneau	1887–1904	Liberal
 Édouard Burroughs Garneau	1904–1911	Liberal
 Georges-Élie Amyot 	1912–1930	Liberal
 Alfred-Valère Roy	1930–1942	Liberal
 Cyrille Vaillancourt	1943–1944	Liberal
 Charles Delagrave	1944–1952	Liberal
 Joseph Boulanger	1952–1963	Union Nationale
 George O'Reilly	1964–1968	Liberal

De Lanaudière
 Pierre-Eustache Dostaler	1867–1884	Conservative
 Louis-François-Rodrigue Masson	1884	Conservative
 Vincent-Paul Lavallée	1885–1888	Conservative
 Louis Sylvestre	1890–1905	Liberal
 Jules Allard	1905–1910	Liberal
 Louis-Philippe Bérard	1912–1914	Liberal
 Jules Allard	1916–1919	Liberal
 Clément Robillard	1919–1926	Liberal
 Gaspard De Serres	1928	Liberal
 Joseph-Ferdinand Daniel	1929–1940	Liberal
 Félix Messier	1942–1968	Liberal

De la Vallière
 Jean-Baptiste-Georges Proulx	1867–1884	Liberal
 François-Xavier-Ovide Méthot	1884–1908	Conservative
 Adélard Turgeon	1909–1930	Liberal
 Joseph-Charles-Ernest Ouellet	1930–1952	Liberal
 Patrice Tardif	1952–1968	Union Nationale

De Lorimier
 Charles-Séraphin Rodier	1867–1876	Conservative
 Joseph-Gaspard Laviolette	1876–1897	Conservative
 Jean Girouard	1897–1936	Conservative
 Alphonse Raymond	1936–1958	Union Nationale
 John Pozer Rowat	1958–1968	Union Nationale

De Salaberry
 Henry Starnes	1867–1896	Conservative
 Jean-Damien Rolland	1896–1912	Conservative
 Achille Bergevin	1913–1914	Liberal
 Alphonse Racine	1915–1918	Liberal
 Lomer Gouin	1920–1921	Liberal
 Raoul-Ovide Grothé	1927–1968	Liberal

Grandville
 Élisée Dionne	1867–1892	Conservative
 Thomas-Philippe Pelletier	1892–1913	Conservative
 John Hall Kelly	1914–1939	Liberal
 François-Philippe Brais	1940–1968	Liberal

Gulf
 John Le Boutillier	1867–1872	Conservative
 Thomas Savage	1873–1887	Conservative
 David Alexander Ross	1887–1897	Liberal
 Richard Turner	1897–1917	Liberal
 Frank Carrel	1918–1940	Liberal
 Jules-André Brillant	1942–1968	Liberal

Inkerman
 George Bryson	1867–1887	Conservative
 George Bryson	1887–1937	Liberal
 Charles Allan Smart	1937	Conservative
 Martin Beattie Fisher	1939–1941	Union Nationale
 Robert R. Ness	1942–1960	Liberal
 George Carlyle Marler	1960–1968	Liberal

Kennebec
 Isidore Thibaudeau	1867–1874	Liberal
 Louis Richard	1874–1876	Conservative
 Joseph Gaudet	1877–1882	Conservative
 Elzéar Gérin	1882–1887	Conservative
 Édouard-Louis Pacaud	1887–1889	Liberal
 Napoléon-Charles Cormier	1889–1915	Liberal
 François-Théodore Savoie	1915–1921	Liberal
 Paul Tourigny	1921–1926	Liberal
 Joseph-Édouard Caron	1927–1929	Liberal
 Élisée Thériault	1929–1958	Liberal
 Ernest Benoît	1959–1968	Union Nationale

La Salle
 Louis Panet	1867–1884	Conservative
 Praxède Larue	1885–1896	Conservative
 Vildebon-Winceslas Larue	1896–1906	Conservative
 Charles-Eugène Dubord	1907–1917	Liberal
 Philippe-Jacques Paradis	1917–1927	Liberal
 Louis Alfred Letourneau	1927–1938	Liberal
 Jean Mercier	1939	Union Nationale
 Pierre Bertrand	1939–1948	Union Nationale
 Joseph-Théophile Larochelle	1948–1954	Union Nationale
 Alfred-Albert Bouchard	1954–1968	Union Nationale

Lauzon
 Alexandre-René Chaussegros de Léry	1867–1880	Conservative
 George Couture	1881–1887	Conservative
 Louis-Philippe Pelletier	1888	Conservative
 Louis-Napoléon Larochelle	1888–1890	Conservative
 Nicodème Audet	1892–1905	Conservative
 Blaise-Ferdinand Letellier	1905–1910	Liberal
 Eugène Roberge	1912–1935	Liberal
 Émile Moreau	1935–1959	Liberal
 Gérald Martineau	1959–1968	Union Nationale

Mille-Isles
 Félix-Hyacinthe Lemaire	1867–1879	Conservative
 Jean-Baptiste Lefebvre de Villemure	1880–1882	Conservative
 Alexandre Lacoste	1882–1883	Conservative
 Charles Champagne	1883–1888	Conservative
 David Marsil	1888–1899	Liberal
 François-Xavier Mathieu	1900–1908	Liberal
 Hector Champagne	1908–1941	Liberal
 Francis Lawrence Connors	1942–1964	Liberal
 Lionel Bertrand	1964–1968	Liberal

Montarville
 Charles-Eugène Boucher de Boucherville	1867–1915	Conservative
 Joseph-Léonide Perron	1916–1929	Liberal
 Narcisse Pérodeau	1929–1932	Liberal
 Gustave Lemieux	1932–1956	Liberal
 Émile Lesage	1956–1963	Union Nationale
 Arthur Dupré	1963–1968	Liberal

Repentigny
 Louis Archambeault	1867–1888	Conservative
 Horace Archambeault	1888–1908	Liberal
 Achille Bergevin	1910–1913	Liberal
 Georges-Aimé Simard	1913–1921	Liberal
 Georges-Aimé Simard	1923–1953	Liberal
 Édouard Masson	1953–1967	Union Nationale
 Marcel Faribault	1967–1968	Union Nationale

Rigaud
 Eustache Prud'homme	1867–1888	Conservative
 Wilfrid Prévost	1888–1898	Liberal
 Joseph Lanctôt	1898–1914	Liberal
 Joseph-Adolphe Chauret	1915–1918	Liberal
 Séverin Létourneau	1919–1922	Liberal
 Édouard Ouellette	1923–1931	Liberal
 Victor Marchand	1932–1960	Liberal
 Jean Raymond	1960–1968	Union Nationale

Rougemont
 John Fraser de Berry	1867–1876	Conservative
 Pierre Boucher de la Bruère	1877–1895	Conservative
 Gédéon Ouimet	1895–1905	Conservative
 François Gosselin	1906–1909	Liberal
 Ernest Choquette	1910–1941	Liberal
 Wilfrid Bovey	1942–1956	Liberal
 Joseph-Henri-Albiny Paquette	1958–1967	Union Nationale
 Jean-Guy Cardinal	1967–1968	Union Nationale

Shawinigan
 John Jones Ross	1867–1901	Conservative
 Némèse Garneau 	1901–1937	Liberal
 Jean-Louis Baribeau	1938–1968	Union Nationale

Stadacona
 Thomas McGreevy	1867–1874	Conservative
 John Sharples, Sr.	1874–1876	Conservative
 John Hearn	1877–1892	Conservative
 John Roche	1892–1893	Conservative
 John Sharples, Jr.	1893–1913	Conservative
 John Charles Kaine	1915–1923	Liberal
 William Gerard Power	1923–1934	Liberal
 Hector Laferté	1934–1968	Liberal

Saurel
 David Morrison Armstrong	1867–1873	Conservative
 Pierre-Euclide Roy	1873–1882	Conservative
 Joseph-Adolphe Dorion	1882–1897	Conservative
 Narcisse Pérodeau	1897–1924	Liberal
 Pamphile-Réal Du Tremblay	1925–1955	Liberal
 Jean Barrette	1955–1968	Union Nationale

The Laurentides
 Jean-Élie Gingras	1867–1887	Conservative
 Guillaume Bresse	1887–1892	Liberal
 Thomas Chapais	1892–1946	Conservative
 Gérald Martineau	1946–1959	Union Nationale
 Antonio Auger	1959–1968	Union Nationale

Victoria
 James Ferrier	1867–1888	Conservative
 Hugh Mackay	1888	Liberal
 James Kewley Ward	1888–1910	Liberal
 George Robert Smith	1911–1922	Liberal
 Henry Miles	1923–1932	Liberal
 Gordon Wallace Scott	1932–1940	Liberal
 George Gordon Hyde	1942–1946	Liberal
 George Buchanan Foster	1946–1968	Union Nationale

Wellington
 Edward Hale	1867–1875	Conservative
 William Hoste Webb	1875–1887	Conservative
 Francis Edward Gilman	1887–1917	Liberal
 William Frederick Vilas	1917–1930	Liberal
 Gordon Wallace Scott	1930–1931	Liberal
 William Stephen Bullock	1931–1936	Liberal
 Louis-Arthur Giroux	1937–1945	Union Nationale
 Édouard Asselin	1946–1968	Union Nationale

External links
 Members of the Legislative Council of Quebec (by divisions) 

Legco